We Walk from Safety is the second full-length studio album from post-hardcore band Repeater, released in August 2011. It was the second collaboration between Repeater and producer Ross Robinson (the first being Patterns EP). The title of the album is taken from a song with the same name which appears on Repeater's 2005 demo.

Track listing

Personnel
Musicians
Steve Krolikowski (vocals and guitar)
Rob Wallace (keyboards)
Victor Cuevas (bass)
Alex Forsythe (guitar)
Matt Hanief (drums)

Technical
Produced, engineered and mixed By Ross Robinson
Mastered by Alan Douches

Reception

The release of the album was highly anticipated. Like Radiohead's Rainbows album, 'We Walk From Safety' was released for a "Name Your Own Price."

The album was released to positive reviews.
 (3 out of 4) (Rating 7.2 out of 10) (8.5 out of 10)

The album was chosen as #1 Album Pick of the Year by Popblerd and Editor's choice for #1 Album of 2011 at Sicmagazine.

References

External links 
 Repeater, office website
Repeater, on Facebook
Repeater, on MySpace

2010 albums
Repeater (band) albums